Tapawera is a small town in the Tasman District of New Zealand's South Island. It is situated on the Motueka Valley Highway (formerly ) by the banks of the Motueka River.

History
Tapawera began its life when the Nelson Section railway edged down the Motueka Valley at the opening of the 20th century.  Before the railway construction in the area the Ferry Inn at the ford crossing of the Motueka River was the only building in the vicinity.  

The railway construction camp was situated there for several years and was named Maniaroa after a nearby farming property.  

As the railway advanced down the valley growth came with it.  A butchery and bakery were followed by a grocery store, and in 1902 the Upper Motueka Valley School was relocated to Maniaroa using a traction engine.  The name Tapawera came with the opening of a Post Office in 1905 and the railway station in 1906. 

Tapawera was soon acting as a centre for the surrounding area, supplanting Upper Motueka Valley as the largest settlement beyond Spooners. Upper Motueka Valley lost not only its pre-eminence but its name when it was renamed Mararewa after the station.

Economy
Generally agriculture has surrounded Tapawera but berry growing has been notable up the Tadmor Valley.  

Hop growing has been a feature of the Rakau area towards Tadmor for about a century and has boomed in recent years nearer Tapawera itself so that there are hop farms along the Motueka Valley Highway between the township and Kohatu, from the township heading towards Motueka, and up the Tapawera-Baton Road.

Demographics

Tapawera

It had a population of 330 at the 2018 New Zealand census, an increase of 18 people (5.8%) since the 2013 census, and an increase of 6 people (1.9%) since the 2006 census. There were 120 households. There were 171 males and 162 females, giving a sex ratio of 1.06 males per female, with 75 people (22.7%) aged under 15 years, 63 (19.1%) aged 15 to 29, 144 (43.6%) aged 30 to 64, and 60 (18.2%) aged 65 or older.

Ethnicities were 91.8% European/Pākehā, 17.3% Māori, 0.9% Pacific peoples, 1.8% Asian, and 1.8% other ethnicities (totals add to more than 100% since people could identify with multiple ethnicities).

Although some people objected to giving their religion, 70.0% had no religion, 21.8% were Christian, 0.9% were Hindu and 1.8% had other religions.

Of those at least 15 years old, 24 (9.4%) people had a bachelor or higher degree, and 60 (23.5%) people had no formal qualifications. The employment status of those at least 15 was that 135 (52.9%) people were employed full-time, 33 (12.9%) were part-time, and 12 (4.7%) were unemployed.

Golden Downs statistical area

Golden Downs had a population of 1,827 at the 2018 New Zealand census, an increase of 117 people (6.8%) since the 2013 census, and an increase of 87 people (5.0%) since the 2006 census. There were 678 households. There were 960 males and 867 females, giving a sex ratio of 1.11 males per female. The median age was 44.5 years (compared with 37.4 years nationally), with 342 people (18.7%) aged under 15 years, 285 (15.6%) aged 15 to 29, 924 (50.6%) aged 30 to 64, and 279 (15.3%) aged 65 or older.

Ethnicities were 93.9% European/Pākehā, 11.0% Māori, 0.8% Pacific peoples, 1.3% Asian, and 1.5% other ethnicities (totals add to more than 100% since people could identify with multiple ethnicities).

The proportion of people born overseas was 14.4%, compared with 27.1% nationally.

Although some people objected to giving their religion, 64.7% had no religion, 24.1% were Christian, 0.2% were Hindu, 0.3% were Buddhist and 1.5% had other religions.

Of those at least 15 years old, 180 (12.1%) people had a bachelor or higher degree, and 333 (22.4%) people had no formal qualifications. The median income was $28,400, compared with $31,800 nationally. The employment status of those at least 15 was that 804 (54.1%) people were employed full-time, 261 (17.6%) were part-time, and 27 (1.8%) were unemployed.

Amenities 

Tapawera's facilities include a school, a Four Square supermarket, a hotel (bar and restaurant), a cafe, a campground, a petrol station, a fitness centre and a vehicle workshop.

Attractions 
Tapawera is a gateway to the Kahurangi National Park. There are several shorter tracks accessible from Tapawera but the main attraction in this corner of the park is the Wangapeka Track which crosses to the West Coast south of Karamea. Access to the track is via the Tadmor-Bushend Road and on to the Wangapeka valley. At the junction of the Wangapeka and Dart rivers there is a concrete ford (which needs care) over the Dart River. After seven kilometres there is the Siberia Flat campsite and the Wangapeka Track starts 1 km further on, at the Rolling River carpark.

Shedwood Bush Conservation Area: This area of native bush along the eastern edge of the village offers walks and a scenic lookout.

The Hidden Sculpture Garden is 5 km from town towards Kohatu.

Cycle Tourism 
Tapawera is part of two increasingly popular cycle trails.

Tapawera sits astride Tasman’s Great Taste Trail.  The trail starts in Nelson and takes cyclists to Richmond, Brightwater, Wakefield, and through the 1.4km-long Spooners Tunnel to Kohatu.  The trail from Kohatu to Tapawera is off-road except for one short section on road. From Tapawera cyclists can now journey on a picturesque route up Tapawera-Baton Road, which further up the valley follows the Wangapeka River. The gravel road then takes cyclists over a saddle to the Baton River. A swingbridge over the Baton was opened in April 2022.  After crossing the river the trail follows the Baton Valley Road to the Baton Bridge at Woodstock.  There is work still to be done on the next section but cyclists follow the Motueka West Bank Road to Riwaka.

The gravel road sections on this part of the trail call for caution, especially further up the Tapawera-Baton Road, as they can be busier than some people expect including with heavy vehicles.  Dust is also an issue.   

The township is also the starting point of the Tapawera to Murchison Heartland Ride which travels up the Tadmor Valley to Glenhope and then on to Murchison via Lake Rotoroa.

Tapawera is also on the route for the Tour Aotearoa brevet which is now held annually. This event travels the length of the country and in Tasman follows the Great Taste Trail to Tapawera and then the route of the Tapawera to Murchison Heartland ride.

Education

Tapawera Area School is a co-educational state area school for Year 1 to 13 students.  The school was established in 1942 as the 'Consolidated School' which was formed through the closure and combining of a number of small primary schools across the region.  The local schools that closed in 1942 when the new school first opened were Golden Downs, Kiwi, Korere, Matariki, Motupiko, Stanley Brook, Tadmor, Tapawera, Tui, and Woodstock. Schools closed earlier were Mararewa (1902), Sherry River (1940), and Wangapeka (1938). 
The history of education in the Tapawera area is marked with a series of informative panels and carvings running alongside the school's tennis courts. 

Later the school became a District High School and then finally an Area School.

St Peter's Church 
St Peter's Community Church was consecrated in 1958.

Government
Local: Tapawera is in the Lakes-Murchison Ward of the Tasman District Council.  The current mayor is Tim King and the ward councillor is Stuart Bryant. 

Another channel to the district council is through the Tapawera and Districts Community Council, one of a number of community organisations throughout Tasman which   support and advocate for residents in their local communities and make submissions to the TDC. The community council has representatives from across the Tapawera area. 

National: Tapawera falls under the West Coast-Tasman electorate which was held in the 2020 General Election by Labour MP Damien O'Connor.

References

External links
The Ferry Inn at Tapawera - a history focusing on the old accommodation house established at the future site of the Tapawera township

Populated places in the Tasman District